Hermann Rauhe (born 6 March 1930) is a German musicologist.

Life 

Rauhe was born in Wanna/Niederelbe. In 1955 he passed the First State Examination for the teaching profession at grammar schools with the combined subject music and German teaching. In 1959 he passed the Second State Examination and then the doctorate of philosophy (musicology).

Scientific career 

In 1960 Rauhe became an assistant, in 1963 a lecturer at the University of Hamburg and since 1965 he has been a professor of musicology and music education at the Hamburg University of Music. In 1970 he returned to the University of Hamburg as Ordinarius for Educational Science with a focus on Music Pedagogy. From 1978 to 2004 Rauhe was President of the Hamburg University of Music and Drama, and from 1980 to 1982 also Chairman of the Rectors' Conference of the Universities of Music in the Federal Republic of Germany.

Main areas of work 
Rauhe made special efforts to develop new methods of Music therapy Impact research. For this reason, Rauhe works in the German Society for Preventive Medicine and Prevention Management e.V.. Together with its president Gerd Schnack, Rauhe developed a special method of stress reduction, the so-called repetitive meditation training.

He also worked in the field of professional research and development ("Music professions in transition").

Honours 
 Since 2004, Rauhe has been Honorary President of the Hamburg University of Music and Theatre
 2004 Johannes Brahms Medal
 2006 Officer's Cross of the Order of Merit of the Federal Republic of Germany.
 2015

Publications 
 Dichtung und Musik im weltlichen Vokalwerk Johann Hermann Scheins. Stilistische und kompositionstechnische Untersuchungen zum Wort-Ton-Verhältnis im Lichte der rhetorisch ausgerichteten Sprach- und Musiktheorie des 17. Jahrhunderts. Hamburg 1959.
 Popularität in der Musik. Interdisziplinäre Aspekte musikalischen Kommunikation. Verlag Braun, Karlsruhe 1974, .
 with Hans-Peter Reinecke and Wilfried Ribke: Hören und Verstehen. Theorie und Praxis handlungsorientierten Unterrichts. Kösel-Verlag, Munich 1975, .
 Musik hilft heilen. Arcis-Verlag, München 1993, .
 with Reinhard Flender: Schlüssel zur Musik. Atlantis-Musikbuch-Verlag, Mainz 1998, .
 with Gerd Schnack: Topfit durch Nichtstun. RMT – die Formel für optimale Energie. Kösel-Verlag, Munich 2002, .

References

External links 

 
 Internetpräsenz
 Biographie

20th-century German musicologists
20th-century German educators
Academic staff of the University of Hamburg
German writers about music
Officers Crosses of the Order of Merit of the Federal Republic of Germany
1930 births
Living people
People from Cuxhaven (district)